Danny Chia Chee Wing (born 29 November 1972) is a Malaysian professional golfer.

Chia was the leading Malaysian amateur in the mid-1990s and turned professional in 1996. He plays on the Asian Tour, where he won the 2002 Taiwan Open. He was the first Malaysian to win on the Tour. He has also won several lower profile professional tournaments in Malaysia and elsewhere.

In 2002, Chia became the second Malaysian to play in The Open Championship (and the first from a mainstream Malaysian background; his predecessor Iain Steel has a Scottish father, and attended school in Scotland and college in the United States, and therefore has a much more traditional golfing pedigree). Chia represented Malaysia in the WGC-World Cup in 2001 and 2002.

Amateur wins
1993 Malaysian Amateur Championship, Selangor Amateur Open (Malaysia)
1994 Malaysian Amateur Championship, Selangor Amateur Open (Malaysia)
1995 Malaysian Amateur Championship, Selangor Amateur Open (Malaysia)

Professional wins (19)

Asian Tour wins (2)

Asian Development Tour wins (4)

1Co-sanctioned by the Professional Golf of Malaysia Tour

ASEAN PGA Tour wins (2)

Other wins (11)
1996 EVA Air Open (Singapore), Jakarta Raya Open (Indonesia)
1999 Singapore Mini Tour event, Malaysian Mini Tour event
2001 Champion of Champions (Singapore), PNB OOM Challenge (Malaysia)
2002 Sime Darby Masters (Malaysia)
2003 Genting Masters (Malaysia), Classic I (Malaysia), Classic II (Malaysia)
2004 Kinrara Masters (Malaysia)

Results in major championships

Note: Chia only played in The Open Championship.

CUT = missed the half-way cut
"T" = tied

Results in World Golf Championships

Team appearances
Professional
World Cup (representing Malaysia): 2000, 2001, 2016
EurAsia Cup (representing Asia): 2016

References

External links

Malaysian male golfers
Asian Tour golfers
Malaysian people of Chinese descent
Olympic golfers of Malaysia
Golfers at the 2016 Summer Olympics
1972 births
Living people